Adelsried is a municipality in the district of Augsburg in Bavaria in Germany.

Location 
Adelsried is located on the edge of the swabic Holzwinkel in Naturpark Augsburg – Western Forests in Landkreis Augsburg and around 20 km from Augsburg. 

The Holzwinkel locked in 5 suburbs of Adelsried, Bonstetten, Heretsried, Welden and Emersacker. It is a densely forested area.

Parts 
 Adelsried, Mainarea,
 Kruichen, Village
 Engelshof, wasteland

References

Augsburg (district)